Salmon Lane Lock is a lock on the Regent's Canal, in Limehouse in the London Borough of Tower Hamlets. A new footbridge at the lock was completed in February 2005 connecting Parnham Street to Salmon Lane.

See also

Canals of the United Kingdom
History of the British canal system
Geograph

References

Locks on the Regent's Canal
Geography of the London Borough of Tower Hamlets
Buildings and structures in the London Borough of Tower Hamlets
Limehouse